Condor Não-Letal or Condor Tecnologias Não-Letais, is a Brazilian company of the war industry, defense, pyrotechnics and non-lethal weaponry. Its portfolio includes several non-lethal products such as rubber bullets, tear gas grenades, impact and morale grenades, tear gas grenade launchers, disabling electroshock devices, and pyrotechnics for signaling and rescue.

About 50% of Condor's non-lethal weapons production is exported to countries in Africa and the Middle East.

History 

Founded in 1985 by a former director of Química Tupan, a former supplier of landmines to the Brazilian Army, on the same site as the old factory, Condor became the first specialized manufacturer of non-lethal weaponry to set up shop in Brazil.

In 2001, it exported its armaments for the first time, under order from the Brazilian Army for a UN peacekeeping mission in Algeria. In 2003, in the book "Non-Lethal Weapons," U.S. Colonel John B. Alexander, a consultant to the U.S. Department of Defense and former commander of the Green Berets in the Vietnam War, mentioned the manufacturer and its armaments in the book.

References

Notes

Bibliography

Firearm manufacturers of Brazil
Defence companies of Brazil
Companies based in Rio de Janeiro (state)
Manufacturing companies established in 1985
1985 establishments in Brazil
Brazilian brands